NBA Hoopz is a basketball video game published by Midway Games. It is the sequel to NBA Hangtime and NBA Showtime: NBA on NBC. Hoopz was the only 3-on-3, arcade-style basketball video game available during the 2000–01 NBA season.

Overview
Rather than 5-on-5 action like professional play, this game features 3-on-3 play. Using players from the NBA, each player chooses a guard, forward, and center from the team's NBA roster for the first half and can make substitutions for the second half.

Fouls are only called on flagrant pushes, foul shots are rare (and only after a number of fouls are accumulated), and there is no out of bounds. In addition, after a player makes three consecutive shots he becomes "on fire" which allows him to make almost any shot as well as goaltend without penalty. The PlayStation 2 and Dreamcast versions accommodate up to four players.

Features
More than 500 High Flyin' Animations
Sharp Graphics, Player Models and Animated Crowds
Addicting Mini-Games like 21, 2ball and Around the World
Secret Hidden Courts like Beachside and Street Court
Jammin' On-Fire Mode
Official NBA Stats and Player Rosters

The uniforms for the Orlando Magic and Phoenix Suns were not updated for the game. These teams sported the uniforms they had in the 1997-98 NBA season instead of the ones they had in the 2000-01 NBA season.

Reception

The Dreamcast and PlayStation 2 versions received "mixed" reviews, according to the review aggregation website Metacritic. GameZone gave the former console version universal acclaim, a few weeks before its release date. Rob Smolka of NextGen said of the latter console version, "Sloppy dunk animations and a blatant lack of originality draws a technical foul on NBA Hoopz."

Notes

References

External links
NBA Hoopz at Eurocom

2001 video games
Eurocom games
Multiplayer and single-player video games
National Basketball Association video games
Game Boy Color games
Dreamcast games
PlayStation (console) games
PlayStation 2 games
Midway video games
Video games developed in the United Kingdom
Video games developed in Australia
Video games scored by Jonathan Hey
Torus Games games